David Abraham may refer to:

 David Abraham (television executive) (born 1963), British television executive
 David Abraham (footballer) (born 1986), Argentine professional footballer
 David Abraham Cheulkar (1909–1982), Indian film actor

See also

David Abrahams (disambiguation)